The following is a list of notable actresses from Republic of China

A
Ady An

B
Bianca Bai

C
Angela Chang
Janine Chang
Sylvia Chang
Joyce Chao
Annie Chen
Ella Chen
Ivy Chen
Joe Chen
Alyssa Chia
May Chin
Amanda Chou
Genie Chuo

F
Mavis Fan
Beatrice Fang
Abby Fung

G
Gwei Lun-mei

H
Elva Hsiao
Barbie Hsu
Dee Hsu
Beatrice Hsu
Valen Hsu
Vivian Hsu
Yuki Hsu
Albee Huang
Kelly Huang
Lynn Hung

J
Selina Jen
Elaine Jin

K
Ko Chia-yen
Claire Kuo
Kuo Shu-yao

L
Pauline Lan
Tia Lee
Ann Li
Liao Hsiao-chun
Ariel Lin
Brigitte Lin
Penny Lin
Ruby Lin
Rene Liu
Joelle Lu

M
Megan Lai

P
Pai Bing-bing

R
Selina Ren

S
Barbie Shu
Dee Shu
Shu Qi
Shih Szu

T
Queenie Tai
Teresa Teng
Hebe Tien
Betty Ting
Jolin Tsai
Tsai Yi-chen
Joanne Tseng
Alice Tzeng

W
Cyndi Wang
Annie Wu
Emma Wu
Jacklyn Wu
Pace Wu

Y
Rainie Yang
Annie Yi

 
Lists of actors by nationality
Taiwanese
Actresses
Actresses
Actresses